Oak Ridge National Laboratory (ORNL) is a federally funded research and development center in Oak Ridge, Tennessee, United States. Founded in 1943, the laboratory is now sponsored by the United States Department of Energy and administered by UT–Battelle, LLC.

Established in 1943, ORNL is the largest science and energy national laboratory in the Department of Energy system (by size) and third largest by annual budget. It is located in the Roane County section of Oak Ridge, Tennessee. Its scientific programs focus on materials, nuclear science, neutron science, energy, high-performance computing, systems biology and national security, sometimes in partnership with the state of Tennessee, universities and other industries.

ORNL has  several of the world's top supercomputers, including Frontier, ranked by the TOP500 as the world's most powerful. The lab is a leading neutron and nuclear power research facility that includes the Spallation Neutron Source, the High Flux Isotope Reactor, and the Center for Nanophase Materials Sciences.

Overview
Oak Ridge National Laboratory is managed by UT–Battelle, a limited liability partnership between the University of Tennessee and the Battelle Memorial Institute, formed in 2000 for that purpose. The annual budget is US$2.4 billion. As of 2021 there is a staff of 5,700 working at ORNL, around 2,000 of whom are scientists and engineers, and an additional 3,200 guest researchers annually.

There are five campuses on the Department of Energy's Oak Ridge reservation: the National Laboratory, the Y-12 National Security Complex, the East Tennessee Technology Park (formerly the Oak Ridge Gaseous Diffusion Plant), the Oak Ridge Institute for Science and Education, and the developing Oak Ridge Science and Technology Park, although the four other facilities are unrelated to the National Laboratory. The total area of the reservation 150 square kilometres (58 sq mi) of which the lab takes up 18 square kilometres (7 sq mi).

History 

In 1934, the Freel Farm Mound Site, an archaeological site and burial mound of the Late Woodland period was excavated.

The city of Oak Ridge was established by the Army Corps of Engineers as part of the Clinton Engineer Works in 1942 on isolated farm land as part of the Manhattan Project.
During the war, advanced research for the government was managed at the site by the University of Chicago's Metallurgical Laboratory.  In 1943, construction of the "Clinton Laboratories" was completed, later renamed to "Oak Ridge National Laboratory".  The site was chosen for the X-10 Graphite Reactor, used to produce plutonium from natural uranium for the Manhattan project.  Enrico Fermi and his colleagues developed the world's second self-sustaining nuclear reactor after Fermi's previous experiment, the Chicago Pile-1.  The X-10 was the first reactor designed for continuous operation.  After the end of World War II the demand for weapons-grade plutonium fell and the reactor and the laboratory's 1,000 employees were no longer involved in nuclear weapons.  Instead, it was used for scientific research.  In 1946 the first medical isotopes were produced in the X-10 reactor, and by 1950 almost 20,000 samples had been shipped to various hospitals.  As the demand for military science had fallen dramatically, the future of the lab was uncertain.  Management of the lab was contracted by the US government to Monsanto; however, they withdrew in 1947.  The University of Chicago re-assumed responsibility, until in December 1947, when Union Carbide and Carbon Co., which already operated two other facilities at Oak Ridge, took control of the laboratory. Alvin Weinberg was named Director of Research, ORNL, and in 1955 Director of the Laboratory.

In 1950 the Oak Ridge School of Reactor Technology was established with two courses in reactor operation and safety; almost 1,000 students graduated.  Much of the research performed at ORNL in the 1950s was related to nuclear reactors as a form of energy production, both for propulsion and electricity.  More reactors were built in the 1950s than in the rest of the ORNL's history combined.

Another project was the world's first light water reactor.  With its principles of neutron moderation and fuel cooling by ordinary water, it is the direct ancestor of most modern nuclear power stations.  The US Military funded much of its development, for nuclear-powered submarines and ships of the US Navy.

The US Army contracted portable nuclear reactors in 1953 for heat and electricity generation in remote military bases.  The reactors were designed at ORNL, produced by American Locomotive Company and used in Greenland, the Panama Canal Zone and Antarctica.  The United States Air Force (USAF) also contributed funding to three reactors, the lab's first computers, and its first particle accelerators.  ORNL designed and tested a nuclear-powered aircraft in 1954 as a proof-of-concept for a proposed USAF fleet of long-range bombers, although it never flew.

The provision of radionuclides by X-10 for medicine grew steadily in the 1950s with more isotopes available.  ORNL was the only Western source of californium-252. ORNL scientists lowered the immune systems of mice and performed the world's first successful bone marrow transplant.

In the early 1960s there was a large push at ORNL to develop nuclear-powered desalination plants, where deserts met the sea, to provide water. The project, called Water for Peace, was backed by John F. Kennedy and Lyndon B. Johnson, and presented at a 1964 United Nations conference, but increases in the cost of construction and falling public confidence in nuclear power caused the plan to fail.  The Health Physics Research Reactor built in 1962 was used for radiation exposure experiments leading to more accurate dosage limits and dosimeters, and improved radiation shielding.

In 1964 the Molten-Salt Reactor Experiment began with the construction of the reactor. It was operated from 1966 until 1969 (with six months down time to move from U-235 to U-233 fuel), and proved the viability of molten salt reactors, while also producing fuel for other reactors as a byproduct of its own reaction.

The High Flux Isotope Reactor built in 1965 had the highest neutron flux of any reactor at the time.  It improved upon the work of the X-10 reactor, producing more medical isotopes, as well as allowing higher fidelity of materials research.

Researchers in the Biology Division studied the effects of chemicals on mice, including petrol fumes, pesticides, and tobacco.

In the late 1960s, cuts in funding led to the cancellation of plans for another particle accelerator, and the United States Atomic Energy Commission cut the breeder reactor program by two-thirds, leading to a downsizing in staff from 5000 to 3800.

In the 1970s, the prospect of fusion power was strongly considered, sparking research at ORNL.  A tokamak called ORMAK, made operational in 1971, was the first tokamak to achieve a plasma temperature of 20 million Kelvin.  After the success of the fusion experiments, it was enlarged and renamed ORMAK II in 1973; however, the experiments ultimately failed to lead to fusion power plants.

The US Atomic Energy Commission required improved safety standards in the early 1970s for nuclear reactors, so ORNL staff wrote almost 100 requirements covering many factors including fuel transport and earthquake resistance.  In 1972 the AEC held a series of public hearings where emergency cooling requirements were highlighted and the safety requirements became more stringent.

ORNL was involved in analysing the damage to the core of the Three Mile Island Nuclear Generating Station after the accident in 1979.

Also in 1972, Peter Mazur, a biologist at ORNL, froze with liquid nitrogen, thawed and implanted mouse embryos in a surrogate mother.  The mouse pups were born healthy.  The technique is popular in the livestock industry, as it allows the embryos of valuable cattle to be transported easily and a prize cow can have multiple eggs extracted and thus, through in vitro fertilisation, have many more offspring than would naturally be possible.

In 1974 Alvin Weinberg, director of the lab for 19 years, was replaced by Herman Postma, a fusion scientist.

In 1977 construction began for 6 metre (20 foot) superconducting electromagnets, intended to control fusion reactions.  The project was an international effort: three electromagnets were produced in the US, one in Japan, one in Switzerland and the final by remaining European states.  Experimentation continued into the 1980s.

The 1980s brought more changes to ORNL: a focus on efficiency became paramount.

An accelerated climate simulation chamber was built that applied varying weather conditions to insulation to test its efficacy and durability faster than real time.  Materials research into heat resistant ceramics for use in truck and high-tech car engines was performed, building upon the materials research that began in the nuclear reactors of the 1950s.  In 1987 the High Temperature Materials Laboratory was established, where ORNL and industry researchers cooperated on ceramic and alloy projects.  The materials research budget at ORNL doubled after initial uncertainty regarding Reagan's economic policy of less government expenditure.

In 1981, the Holifield Heavy Ion Research Facility, a 25 MV particle accelerator, was opened at ORNL.  At the time, Holifield had the widest range of ion species and was twice as powerful as other accelerators, attracting hundreds of guest researchers each year.

The Department of Energy was concerned with the pollution surrounding ORNL and it began clean-up efforts.  Burial trenches and leaking pipes had contaminated the groundwater beneath the lab, and radiation tanks were sitting idle, full of waste.  Estimates of the total cost of clean-up were into the hundreds of millions of US dollars.

The five older reactors were subjected to safety reviews in 1987, ordered to be deactivated until the reviews were complete.  By 1989 when the High Flux Isotope Reactor was restarted the US supply of certain medical isotopes was depleted.

In 1989 the former executive officer of the American Association for the Advancement of Science, Alvin Trivelpiece, became director of ORNL; he remained in the role until 2000.

In 1992, a whistleblower, Charles Varnadore, filed complaints against ORNL, alleging safety violations and retaliation by his superiors.  While an administrative law judge ruled in Varnadore's favor, the Secretary of Labor, Robert Reich, overturned that ruling.  However, Varnadore's case saw prime contractor Martin Marietta cited for safety violations, and ultimately led to additional whistleblower protection within DOE.

In January 2019 ORNL announced a major breakthrough in its capacity to automate Pu-238 production which helped push annual production from 50 grams to 400 grams, moving closer to NASA's goal of 1.5 kilograms per year by 2025 in order to sustain its space exploration programs.

Areas of research
ORNL conducts research and development activities that span a wide range of scientific disciplines. Many research areas have a significant overlap with each other; researchers often work in two or more of the fields listed here. The laboratory's major research areas are described briefly below.
 Chemical sciences – ORNL conducts both fundamental and applied research in a number of areas, including catalysis, surface science and interfacial chemistry; molecular transformations and fuel chemistry; heavy element chemistry and radioactive materials characterization; aqueous solution chemistry and geochemistry; mass spectrometry and laser spectroscopy; separations chemistry; materials chemistry including synthesis and characterization of polymers and other soft materials; chemical biosciences; and neutron science.
 Electron microscopy  – ORNL's electron microscopy program investigates key issues in condensed matter, materials, chemical and nanosciences.
 Nuclear medicine – The laboratory's nuclear medicine research is focused on the development of improved reactor production and processing methods to provide medical radioisotopes, the development of new radionuclide generator systems, the design and evaluation of new radiopharmaceuticals for applications in nuclear medicine and oncology.
 Physics – Physics research at ORNL is focused primarily on studies of the fundamental properties of matter at the atomic, nuclear, and subnuclear levels and the development of experimental devices in support of these studies.
 Population – ORNL provides federal, state and international organizations with a gridded population database, called Landscan, for estimating ambient population. LandScan is a raster image, or grid, of population counts, which provides human population estimates every 30 x 30 arc seconds, which translates roughly to population estimates for 1 kilometer square windows or grid cells at the equator, with cell width decreasing at higher latitudes. Though many population datasets exist, LandScan is the best spatial population dataset, which also covers the globe. Updated annually (although data releases are generally one year behind the current year) offers continuous, updated values of population, based on the most recent information.  Landscan data are accessible through GIS applications and a USAID public domain application called Population Explorer.

Energy
 
The laboratory has a long history of energy research; nuclear reactor experiments have been conducted since the end of World War II in 1945. Because of the availability of reactors and high-performance computing resources an emphasis on improving the efficiency of nuclear reactors is present. The programs develop more efficient materials, more accurate simulations of aging reactor cores, sensors and controls as well as safety procedures for regulatory authorities.

The Energy Efficiency and Electricity Technologies Program (EEETP) aims to improve air quality in the US and reduce dependence on foreign oil supplies. There are three key areas of research; electricity, manufacturing and mobility. The electricity division focuses on reducing electricity consumption and finding alternative sources for production. Buildings, which account for 39% of US electricity consumption as of 2012, are a key area of research as the program aims to create affordable, carbon-neutral homes by 2020. Research also takes place into higher efficiency solar panels, geothermal electricity and heating, lower cost wind generators and the economic and environmental feasibility of potential hydro power plants.

Fusion is another area with a history of research at ORNL, dating back to the 1950s. The Fusion Energy Division pursues short-term goals to develop components such as high temperature superconductors, high-speed hydrogen pellet injectors and suitable materials for future fusion research. Much research into the behaviour and maintenance of a plasma takes place at the Fusion Energy Division to further the understanding of plasma physics, a crucial area for developing a fusion power plant. The US ITER office is at ORNL with partners at Princeton Plasma Physics Laboratory and Savannah River National Laboratory. The US contribution to the ITER project is 9.1% which is expected to be in excess of US$1.6 billion throughout the contract.

Biology
Oak Ridge National Laboratory's biological research covers genomics, computational biology, structural biology and bioinformatics. The BioEnergy Program aims to improve the efficiency of all stages of the biofuel process to improve the energy security of the United States. The program aims to make genetic improvements to the potential biomass used, formulate methods for refineries that can accept a diverse range of fuels and to improve the efficiency of energy delivery both to power plants and end users.

The Center for Molecular Biophysics conducts research into the behaviour of biological molecules in various conditions. The center hosts projects that examine cell walls for biofuel production, use neutron scattering to analyse protein folding and simulate the effect of catalysis on a conventional and quantum scale.

Neutron science
There are two neutron sources at ORNL; the High Flux Isotope Reactor (HFIR) and the Spallation Neutron Source. HFIR provides neutrons in a stable beam resulting from a constant nuclear reaction whereas SNS, a particle accelerator, produces pulses of neutrons. HFIR went critical in 1965 and has been used for materials research and as a major source of medical radioisotopes since. As of 2013, HFIR provides the world's highest constant neutron flux as a result of various upgrades. Berkelium-249, used to synthesize tennessine for the first time, was produced in the High Flux Isotope Reactor as part of an international effort. HFIR is likely to operate until approximately 2060 before the reactor vessel is considered unsafe for continued use.

The Spallation Neutron Source (SNS) is a particle accelerator that has the highest intensity neutron pulses of any man-made neutron source. SNS was made operational in 2006 and has since been upgraded to 1 megawatt with plans to continue up to 3 megawatts. High power neutron pulses permit clearer images of the targets meaning smaller samples can be analysed and accurate results require fewer pulses.

Materials

Oak Ridge National Laboratory conducts research into materials science in a range of areas. Between 2002 and 2008 ORNL partnered with Caterpillar Inc. (CAT) to form a new material for their diesel engines that can withstand large temperature fluctuations. The new steel, named CF8C Plus, is based on conventional CF8C stainless steel with added manganese and nitrogen; the result has better high–temperature properties and is easier to cast at a similar cost. In 2003 the partners received an R&D 100 award from R&D magazine and in 2009 received an award for "excellence in technology transfer" from the Federal Laboratory Consortium for the commercialisation of the steel.

There is a high-temperature materials lab at ORNL that permits researchers from universities, private companies and other government initiatives to use their facilities. As is the case for all designated user facilities, the resources of the High Temperature Materials Laboratory are available for free if the results are published; private research is permitted but requires payment. 

The Center for Nanophase Materials Sciences (CNMS) researches the behaviour and fabrication of nanomaterials. The center emphasises discovery of new materials and the understanding of underlying physical and chemical interactions that enable creation of nanomaterials. In 2012, CNMS produced a lithium-sulfide battery with a theoretical energy density three to five times greater than existing lithium ion batteries.

Security
Oak Ridge National Laboratory provides resources to the US Department of Homeland Security and other defense programs. The Global Security and Nonproliferation (GS&N) program develops and implements policies, both US based and international, to prevent the proliferation of nuclear material. The program has developed safeguards for nuclear arsenals, guidelines for dismantling arsenals, plans of action should nuclear material fall into unauthorised hands, detection methods for stolen or missing nuclear material and trade of nuclear material between the US and Russia. The GS&N's work overlaps with that of the Homeland Security Programs Office, providing detection of nuclear material and nonproliferation guidelines. Other areas concerning the Department Homeland Security include nuclear and radiological forensics, chemical and biological agent detection using mass spectrometry and simulations of potential national hazards.

High-performance computing

Throughout the history of the Oak Ridge National Laboratory it has been the site of various supercomputers, home to the fastest on several occasions. In 1953, ORNL partnered with the Argonne National Laboratory to build ORACLE (Oak Ridge Automatic Computer and Logical Engine), a computer to research nuclear physics, chemistry, biology and engineering. ORACLE had 2048 words (80 Kibit) of memory and took approximately 590 microseconds to perform addition or multiplications of integers. In the 1960s ORNL was also equipped with an IBM 360/91 and an IBM 360/65. In 1995 ORNL bought an Intel Paragon based computer called the Intel Paragon XP/S 150 that performed at 154 gigaFLOPS and ranked third on the TOP500 list of supercomputers. In 2005 Jaguar was built, a Cray XT3-based system that performed at 25 teraFLOPS and received incremental upgrades up to the XT5 platform that performed at 2.3 petaFLOPS in 2009. It was recognised as the world's fastest from November 2009 until November 2010. Summit was built for Oak Ridge National Laboratory during 2018, which benchmarked at 122.3 petaflops. As of June 2020, Summit was the world's second fastest [clocked] supercomputer with 202,752 CPU cores, 27,648 Nvidia Tesla GPUs and 250 Petabytes of storage, having lost the top position to the Japanese Fugaku supercomputer. In May 2022, the ORNL Frontier system broke the exascale barrier, achieving 1.102 exaflop/s using 8,730,112 cores.

Since 1992 the Center for Computational Sciences (CCS) has overseen high performance computing at ORNL. It manages the Oak Ridge Leadership Computing Facility that contains the machines. In 2012, Jaguar was upgraded to the XK7 platform, a fundamental change as GPUs are used for the majority of processing, and renamed Titan. Titan performed at 17.59 petaFLOPS and held the number 1 spot on the TOP500 list for November 2012. Other computers include a 77 node cluster to visualise data that the larger machines output in the Exploratory Visualization Environment for Research in Science and Technology (EVEREST), a visualisation room with a 10 by 3 metre (30 by 10 ft) wall that displays 35 megapixel projections. Smoky is an 80 node linux cluster used for application development. Research projects are refined and tested on Smoky before running on larger machines such as Titan.

In 1989 programmers at the Oak Ridge National Lab wrote the first version of Parallel Virtual Machine (PVM), software that enables distributed computing on machines of differing specifications. PVM is free software and has become the de facto standard for distributed computing. Jack Dongarra of ORNL and the University of Tennessee wrote the LINPACK software library and LINPACK benchmarks, used to calculate linear algebra and the standard method of measuring floating point performance of a supercomputer as used by the TOP500 organisation.

Notable people

See also
 American Museum of Science and Energy
 Brookhaven National Laboratory
 Center for Nanophase Materials Sciences
 K-25 Gaseous Diffusion Plant
 Karl Z. Morgan
 Los Alamos National Laboratory
 National Transportation Research Center
 Sandia National Laboratory
 Spallation Neutron Source
 Thorium Energy Alliance
 United States Department of Energy National Laboratories and Technology Centers
 Y-12 National Security Complex

Footnotes

Further reading
 Lindsey A. Freeman, Longing for the Bomb: Oak Ridge and Atomic Nostalgia. Chapel Hill, NC: University of North Carolina Press, 2015.

External links

 

 
United States Department of Energy national laboratories
Buildings and structures in Roane County, Tennessee
Federally Funded Research and Development Centers
Manhattan Project sites
Uranium
Military history of Tennessee
Military research of the United States
Nuclear power in the United States
Nuclear research institutes
Nuclear technology in the United States
Supercomputer sites
1942 establishments in Tennessee
Battelle Memorial Institute
University of Chicago
University of Tennessee
Cold War sites in the United States
Leadership in Energy and Environmental Design certified buildings
Oak Ridge, Tennessee
Superfund sites in Tennessee
Research institutes in Tennessee